Morocco competed in the Winter Olympic Games for the first time at the 1968 Winter Olympics in Grenoble, France.

Alpine skiing

Men

Men's slalom

References
Official Olympic Reports
 Olympic Winter Games 1968, full results by sports-reference.com

Nations at the 1968 Winter Olympics
1968 Winter Olympics
1968 in Moroccan sport